Peretz Bernstein (born Shlomo Fritz Bernstein; 12 June 1890 – 21 March 1971) was a Zionist activist and Israeli politician and one of the signatories of the Israeli declaration of independence.

Biography
Bernstein was born in Meiningen in the German Empire. He moved to the Netherlands before World War I, where he worked in the grain trade. In 1917, he joined the Zionist Organization, serving as secretary and board member. In 1925, he became editor-in-chief of a Zionist weekly, a role he held until 1935, and between 1930 and 1934 served as the Zionist Organization's president.

He emigrated to Mandate Palestine in 1936, and became editor of the HaBoker newspaper. He joined the Jewish Agency, and became a board member, serving as director of its economics department between 1946 and 1948.

Bernstein was one of the people to sign Israel's declaration of independence on 14 May 1948, and was appointed Minister of Trade and Industry in the provisional government.

He was elected to the first Knesset in 1949 as a member of the General Zionists, but lost his place in the cabinet. Re-elected in 1951, he returned to the cabinet as Minister of Trade and Industry in the fourth and fifth governments. Bernstein also stood as a candidate in the Knesset's election for president in 1952, but withdrew after the second round of voting, having come a distant second to eventual winner Yitzhak Ben-Zvi.

Bernstein returned to the Knesset following the elections of 1955 and 1959, but did not regain his cabinet position. In 1961, the General Zionists merged with the Progressive Party to form the Liberal Party and Bernstein was elected one of its two presidents. He was re-elected to the Knesset later that year and oversaw the alliance with Menachem Begin's Herut to form Gahal. In 1963, he ran again for president, but lost by 67–33 to Zalman Shazar. Bernstein lost his seat in the 1965 elections and died in 1971.

Bibliography
Anti-Semitism as a Social Phenomenon (1926 in German, 1951 in English, 1980 in Hebrew and also in German. In 2008 a new edition at Transaction Publishers was published. It is the unabridged 1951 text, but the title is changed into The Social Roots of Discrimination. The Case of the Jews . An extensive new preface by Bernard van Praag has been added).

References

External links
 

1890 births
1971 deaths
20th-century journalists
Candidates for President of Israel
Dutch emigrants to Mandatory Palestine
Gahal politicians
General Zionists leaders
German emigrants to the Netherlands
19th-century German Jews
Heads of the Jewish Agency for Israel
Israeli journalists
Jewish Israeli politicians
Leaders of the Opposition (Israel)
Liberal Party (Israel) leaders
Members of the 1st Knesset (1949–1951)
Members of the 2nd Knesset (1951–1955)
Members of the 3rd Knesset (1955–1959)
Members of the 4th Knesset (1959–1961)
Members of the 5th Knesset (1961–1965)
People from Meiningen
Signatories of the Israeli Declaration of Independence